Globicatella sulfidifaciens is a Gram-positive bacteria from the family of Globicatella which has been isolated from the lungs of cattle and lambs in Belgium. It is associated with purulent infections of domestic mammals and urinary tracts of swine.  Unlike other Globicatella species and species of related genera, G. sulfidifaciens is PYR negative. Globicatella sulfidifaciens bacteria are resistant against the antibiotics neomycin, erythromycin and clindamycin.

References

Further reading 
 
 

Bacteria described in 2001
Lactobacillales